Surviving Nugent is an American reality television series starring Ted Nugent that aired on VH1.

Overview
Surviving Nugent is television series where contestants travel to rock star Ted Nugent's Texas ranch and live and compete in events of Nugent's choice. The series was filmed near Waco. Nugent suffered injuries on the series from a chainsaw accident.

References

External links

2003 American television series debuts
2004 American television series endings
2000s American reality television series
English-language television shows
VH1 original programming
Television shows set in Texas
Television shows filmed in Texas